Pyusawhti militias (also spelt Pyu Saw Htee) are loosely organised networks of pro-military and pro-junta villagers operating in Myanmar. The term was first used in 1956, after U Nu's government created Pyusawhti paramilitary units to assist the military with counterinsurgency operations. After a coup in 1958, the army tried to disband them, but they instead evolved into the Anti-Fascist People's Freedom League party's personal militias. They were more successfully replaced with Kakweye units after the 1962 coup. In the 2000s the groups re-emerged out of existing local networks of Buddhist nationalists, members of the military's proxy party, Union Solidarity and Development Party, and army veterans. The militias became increasingly active in 2021, when junta-appointed ward and village tract administrators and offices were attacked throughout the country. Observers have noted ties with extremist nationalist groups like the Patriotic Association of Myanmar.

History 
The name comes from Pyusawhti, a legendary king in Burmese history. In 1956, the Burmese government under U Nu devised a local village and town defence scheme, which used paramilitary units called 'Pyusawhti' to assist the Burmese military in counterinsurgency operations. The army attempted to disband and disarm them after the 1958 coup with mixed success. The Pyusawhti quickly became the personal militaries of local leaders appoint by the Anti-Fascist People's Freedom League, the dominant political party at the time. They would rampage rural areas to force votes during the 1956 and 1960 elections. After the 1962 Burmese coup d'état, Ne Win would replace them with his own Kakweye militia units, making the Pyusawhti obsolete.

The term 'Pyusawhti' re-emerged in the 2000s, used by Burmese media in reference pro-military networks and groups. Burmese security forces had previously deployed similar networks, including swan ar shin, during the crackdown on the Saffron Revolution in 2007. Observers have noted ties with extremist nationalist groups like the Patriotic Association of Myanmar.

During the 2021 Myanmar civil war, the Pyusawhti militias often fought with Tatmadaw troops and helped to occupy contested areas. In the wake of the 2021 Myanmar coup d'état and ensuing Myanmar civil war (2021–present), Burmese security forces have leveraged Pyusawhti militias for reinforcements, military intelligence, and knowledge of local terrain. These groups emerged out of existing local networks of Buddhist nationalists, members of the military's proxy party, Union Solidarity and Development Party, and army veterans in the lead-up to the 2020 Myanmar general election. The militias became increasingly active in May 2021 in response to the resistance' attacks on junta-appointed ward and village tract administrators and offices. Police forces armed the otherwise poorly armed Pyusawhti militias with seized hunting guns and other older weapons.

References

External links 

 Crisis Group report on Pyusawhti militias

Paramilitary organisations based in Myanmar
Military of Myanmar